NKC is a three letter abbreviation that may refer to:

IATA airport code for Nouakchott–Oumtounsy International Airport
National Kennel Club, all-breed dog registry in the United States
Nat King Cole, American jazz singer/musician
NDR-Klein-Computer, a German computer
Northwest Kidney Centers, outpatient hemodialysis treatment center
Natural killer cell, cell involved in the innate immune system
National Knowledge Commission, Indian Commission set up by Manmohan Singh